The Land of Nod (Hebrew:  – ʾereṣ-Nōḏ) is a place mentioned in the Book of Genesis of the Hebrew Bible, located "on the east of Eden" (qiḏmaṯ-ʿḖḏen), where Cain was exiled by God after Cain had murdered his brother Abel. According to Genesis 4:16:

Genesis 4:17 relates that after arriving in the Land of Nod, Cain's wife bore him a son, Enoch, in whose name he built the first city.

Name 
"Nod" is the Hebrew root of the verb "to wander". Therefore, to dwell in the land of Nod can mean to live a wandering life. Gesenius defines as follows:

TO BE MOVED, TO BE AGITATED (Arab.  Med. Waw id.), used of a reed shaken by the wind, 1Ki.14:15; hence to wander, to be a fugitive, Jer. 4:1; Gen. 4:12, 14; Ps.56:9; to flee, Ps. 11:1; Jer. 49:30. Figuratively, Isa. 17:11,  "the harvest has fled" ["but see  ," which some take in this place as the subst.].

Much as Cain's name is connected to the verb meaning "to get" in Genesis 4:1, the name "Nod" closely resembles the word "nad", usually translated as "vagabond", in Genesis 4:12. (In the Septuagint's rendering of the same verse God curses Cain to τρέμων, "trembling".)

A Greek version of Nod written as   appearing in the Onomastica Vaticana possibly derives from the plural , which relates to resting and sleeping. This derivation, coincidentally or not, connects with the English pun on "nod".

Interpretation 
Josephus wrote in Antiquities of the Jews (c. AD 93) that Cain continued his wickedness in Nod: resorting to violence and robbery; establishing weights and measures; transforming human culture from innocence into craftiness and deceit; establishing property lines; and building a fortified city.

Nod is said to be outside of the presence or face of God. Origen defined Nod as the land of trembling and wrote that it symbolized the condition of all who forsake God. Early commentators treated it as the opposite of Eden (worse still than the land of exile for the rest of humanity). In the English tradition Nod was sometimes described as a desert inhabited only by ferocious beasts or monsters. Others interpreted Nod as dark or even underground—away from the face of God.

Augustine described unconverted Jews as dwellers in the land of Nod, which he defined as commotion and "carnal disquietude".

Places named "Land of Nod"

Land of Nod is the name of a hamlet in the East Riding of Yorkshire, England. It is located at the far end of a two-mile-long (3.2 km) road, which joins the A614 road at Holme-on-Spalding-Moor.

The name "Land of Nod" was accorded locally to the northerly 3,000 acres (1,214.1 hectares) of the Great Plot lying north of Woburn, Massachusetts, at its foundation in 1640–42, "the name being probably suggested by a comparison of its forlorn condition — so far remote from church ordinances — with the Nod to which Cain wandered when he went 'from the presence of the Lord'." Its Native American name was Nena Saawaattawattocks.

Land of Nod Road is the name of a residential road in Windham, Maine, US, and a private road in Headley Down, Hampshire, UK.

In popular culture
The Land of Nod can refer to the mythical land of sleep, a pun on Land of Nod (Gen. 4:16). To "go off to the land of Nod" plays with the phrase to "nod off", meaning to go to sleep.

The first recorded use of the phrase to mean "sleep" comes from Jonathan Swift in his Complete Collection of Genteel and Ingenious Conversation (1737) and Gulliver's Travels.

A later instance of this usage appears in the poem "The Land of Nod" by Robert Louis Stevenson from the A Child's Garden of Verses (1885) collection.

In the Arc of a Scythe series by Neal Shusterman, the Land of Nod is mythologized as containing a mythical fail-safe against the Scythedom and becomes critically important to the plot of the third book.

In Fevre Dream by George R. R. Martin, the Land of Nod is suggested as a place where vampires originated.

References

Sources 
 Byron, John. Cain and Abel in text and tradition : Jewish and Christian interpretations of the first sibling rivalry. Leiden: Brill, 2011. 
 Delaney, David Kevin. The Sevenfold Vengeance of Cain: Genesis 4 in Early Jewish and Christian Interpretation. PhD dissertation accepted at University of Virginia, May 1996.

External links
 Genesis 4:16 at BibleGateway.com
 Matthew Kempf, The wandering Cainidae, or, The ancient nomads : a lecture delivered to the Medical Society of Dubois County, and to the citizens of Huntingburgh, Indiana, April 22, 1879 

Book of Genesis
Torah places
Cain and Abel